The former Indonesian airline Merpati Nusantara Airlines offered flights to many domestic destinations and to Timor Leste, Australia, Philippines, Malaysia and Singapore.

Destinations

Alor - Mali Airport
Amahai - Amahai Airport
Balikpapan - Sultan Aji Muhammad Sulaiman Sepinggan Airport
Bajawa - Bajawa Soa Airport 
Bandung - Husein Sastranegara International Airport
Banjarmasin - Syamsudin Noor Airport
Banyuwangi - Banyuwangi International Airport
Batam - Hang Nadim Airport
Biak - Frans Kaisiepo Airport
Bima - Bima Airport
Bintuni - Steenkool Airport
Buol - Tolo-Toli Airport
Denpasar - Ngurah Rai International Airport Hub
Ende - H. Hasan Aroeboesman Airport
Gorontalo - Jalaluddin Airport
Jakarta
 Halim Perdanakusuma International Airport Secondary Hub
 Soekarno-Hatta International Airport Main Hub
Jayapura - Sentani Airport
Kaimana - Kaimana Airport
Kambuaya - Kambuaya Airport
Karubaga - Karubaga Airport
Kebar - Kebar Airport
Kendari - Haluoleo Airport
Kepi - Kepi Airport
Kimam - Kimam Airport
Kisar - Kisar Airport
Kupang - El Tari Airport
Labuan Bajo - Komodo Airport
Labuha - Usman Sadik Airport
Langgur - Dumatubin Airport
Larantuka - Gewayentana Airport
Luwuk - Syukuran Aminuddin Amir Airport
Makassar - Sultan Hasanuddin International Airport Hub
Mamuju - Tampa Padang Airport
Manado - Sam Ratulangi International Airport
Mangole - Mangole Airport
Manokwari - Rendani Airport
Mataram - Lombok International Airport
Maumere - Wai Oti Airport
Medan - Kuala Namu International Airport
Melangguane - Melanggguane Airport
Merauke - Mopah Airport
Merdei - Merdei Airport
Meulaboh - Meulaboh Airport
Mulia - Mulia Airport
Nabire - Nabire Airport
Namlea - Namlea Airport
Namrole - Namrole Airport
Nias - Binaka Airport
Okaba - Okaba Airport
Oksibil - Oksibil Airport
Padang - Minangkabau International Airport
Palembang - Sultan Mahmud Badaruddin II Airport
Palu - Mutiara Airport
Pangkal Pinang - Depati Amir Airport
Pekanbaru - Sultan Syarif Kasim II International Airport
Poso - Kasiguncu Airport
Ruteng - Ruteng Airport
Sampit - Sampit Airport
Sanana - Sanana Airport
Sarmi - Sarmi Airport
Saumlaki - Saumlaki Airport
Sawu - Sawu Airport
Senngo - Senggo Airport
Sibolga - Ferdinand Lumban Tobing Airport
Sinabang - Sinabang Airport
Sinak - Sinak Airport
Semarang - Achmad Yani International Airport
Sorong - Sorong Airport
Surabaya - Juanda International Airport Hub
Tanah Merah - Tanah Merah Airport
Tanjung Karang - Radin Inten II Airport
Tarakan - Juwata International Airport
Teminabuan - Teminabuan Airport
Ternate - Babullah Airport
Timika - Timika Airport
Tiom - Tiom Airport
Tolitoli - Toli-Toli Airport
Waingapu - Waingapu Airport
Wamena - Mau Hau Airport
Yogyakarta - Adisucipto International Airport

Sydney - Sydney Airport
Darwin - Darwin International Airport
Canberra - Canberra Airport
Perth - Perth Airport

Subang - Sultan Abdul Aziz Shah Airport (later Kuala Lumpur International Airport)
Kuala Lumpur - Kuala Lumpur International Airport
Penang - Bayan Lepas International Airport

Cebu - Mactan–Cebu International Airport
Davao - Francisco Bangoy International Airport

Singapore - Singapore Changi Airport

Timor Leste - Presidente Nicolau Lobato International Airport

Aviation in Australia
Aviation in East Timor
Aviation in Indonesia
Aviation in Malaysia
Aviation in Singapore
Merpati Nusantara Airlines